"Gott wohnt in einem Lichte" is a German hymn with a text by Jochen Klepper, written in 1938. With a melody by Bartholomäus Gesius (1603), it became part of several hymnals and song books.

The song is full of biblical references. It is part of the Protestant hymnal Evangelisches Gesangbuch as EG 379 and the Catholic hymnal Gotteslob as GL 429, among others.

References

Literature 
 Jochen Klepper: Kyrie. Geistliche Lieder; Berlin-Steglitz: Eckart-Verlag, 1938

External links 
 Gott wohnt in einem Lichte evangeliums.net
 Gedenken an Jochen Kleppers 100. Geburtstag, 22. März 2003 Albrecht Weber theologie.uzh.ch

Catholic hymns in German
1938 songs